Mohamed Hamad (born 10 September 1951) is an Egyptian former wrestler. He competed in two events at the 1984 Summer Olympics.

References

External links
 

1951 births
Living people
Egyptian male sport wrestlers
Olympic wrestlers of Egypt
Wrestlers at the 1984 Summer Olympics
Place of birth missing (living people)
20th-century Egyptian people
21st-century Egyptian people